Obudovac is a village in the municipality of Šamac.

References

Populated places in Šamac, Bosnia and Herzegovina
Villages in Republika Srpska